Anwar Khan is the name of:

Anwar Khan (cricketer) (born 1955), Pakistani former cricketer
Anwar Khan (Guantanamo detainee 948), Afghan, former Guantanamo detainee
Anwar Ahmed Khan (born 1933), Pakistani field hockey player
Anwar Hayat Khan, Pakistani politician
Anwar Kamal Khan (1946–2012), Pakistani politician
Anwar Saifullah Khan (born 1946), Pakistan politician